Het laatste nippertje ("Just in time") is a 2011 play by Dutch writer, artist, and television director Wim T. Schippers. It premiered in the Stadsschouwburg in Amsterdam, and was a co-production with Titus Tiel Groenestege, Titus Muizelaar, and Kees Hulst. The play received less favorable reviews than earlier plays by Schippers; Martijn Kardol, writing for CultuurBewust, commented that it lacked the progressive and groundbreaking qualities of Schippers' 1986 production Going to the Dogs, not rising above flat and repetitive humor, and that the actors lacked the impeccable timing necessary for such a production.

The origin 

many people think the Dutch saying is based on either a part of a ship or as an verbastering of the word knijpen, however the first mention of the word nippertje was in  the art of war to describe not getting home in time before the alcohol hits you

References

Dutch plays
Wim T. Schippers
2011 plays
Plays set in the Netherlands